The 2011 WNBA season is the 12th season for the Seattle Storm of the Women's National Basketball Association.

Transactions

WNBA Draft
The following are the Storm's selections in the 2011 WNBA Draft.

Transaction log
February 2: The Storm re-signed Camille Little.
February 9: The Storm signed Erin Phillips and Belinda Snell.
March 1: The Storm re-signed Swin Cash.
March 15: The Storm re-signed Ashley Robinson and signed Aneika Henry to a training camp contract.
April 8: The Storm signed Bridgette Mitchell to a training camp contract.
April 14: The Storm signed Breanna Salley to a training camp contract.
April 22: The Storm signed Lauren Prochaska to a training camp contract.
April 29: The Storm traded Jasmine Thomas and a first-round pick in the 2012 Draft to the Washington Mystics, and Erin Phillips and a third-round pick in the 2012 Draft to the Indiana Fever, in exchange for Katie Smith and Jacinta Monroe from Washington, and a third-round pick in the 2012 Draft from Indiana.
May 17: The Storm waived Aneika Henry and Breanna Salley.
May 22: The Storm waived Bridgette Mitchell and Lauren Prochaska.
May 23: The Storm signed Sharnee Zoll and waived Courtney Ward.
May 30: The Storm waived Jacinta Monroe.
June 2: The Storm waived Sharnee Zoll.
June 26: The Storm waived Ify Ibekwe and signed Ewelina Kobryn.
August 1: The Storm waived Krystal Thomas and signed Allie Quigley.
August 2: The Storm re-signed Lauren Jackson to a multi-year contract extension.

Trades

Personnel changes

Additions

Subtractions

Roster

Depth

Season standings

Schedule

Preseason

|- align="center" bgcolor="ffbbbb"
| 1 || May 25 || 3:00pm || @ Los Angeles || 66–71 || Willingham (14) || Cash (6) || Wright (7) || Torodome  3,212 || 0–1
|- align="center" bgcolor="bbffbb"
| 2 || May 29 || 5:00pm || Tulsa || 76–70 || Cash (20) || Cash (7) || Bird (8) || KeyArena  4,979 || 1–1
|-

Regular season

|- align="center" bgcolor="bbffbb"
| 1 || June 4 || 3:00pm || Phoenix || ABC || 78–71 || Little (18) || Little (9) || Bird (10) || KeyArena  11,548 || 1–0
|- align="center" bgcolor="ffbbbb"
| 2 || June 9 || 10:00pm || Minnesota ||  || 74–81 || Bird (24) || CashJackson (7) || Cash (5) || KeyArena  6,291 || 1–1
|- align="center" bgcolor="bbffbb"
| 3 || June 17 || 10:00pm || Indiana ||  || 68–54 || Cash (14) || Cash (8) || Cash (5) || KeyArena  8,178 || 2–1 
|- align="center" bgcolor="ffbbbb"
| 4 || June 19 || 8:30pm || @ Los Angeles || PRIME || 50–74 || Bird (15) || Little (8) || CashWright (4) || Staples Center  9,119 || 2–2 
|- align="center" bgcolor="bbffbb"
| 5 || June 21 || 8:00pm || @ Tulsa ||  || 82–77 || Bird (21) || Cash (9) || Bird (6) || BOK Center  4,612 || 3–2
|- align="center" bgcolor="bbffbb"
| 6 || June 24 || 10:00pm || Minnesota || KONG || 65–55 || Little (16) || Cash (9) || Bird (8) || KeyArena  7,914 || 4–2 
|-

|- align="center" bgcolor="ffbbbb"
| 7 || July 1 || 7:30pm || @ Connecticut || CSN-NE || 70–75 || Cash (25) || Cash (9) || Smith (4) || Mohegan Sun Arena  7,748 || 4–3 
|- align="center" bgcolor="bbffbb"
| 8 || July 3 || 4:00pm || @ Washington || NBATVCSN-MA || 73–63 || Cash (19) || Cash (7) || Bird (5) || Verizon Center  11,604 || 5–3
|- align="center" bgcolor="ffbbbb"
| 9 || July 5 || 7:00pm || @ Indiana || FS-I || 61–78 || Bird (21) || Willingham (8) || BirdWright (5) || Conseco Fieldhouse  6,525 || 5–4
|- align="center" bgcolor="bbffbb"
| 10 || July 9 || 10:00pm || Los Angeles || NBATVKONG || 99–80 || Cash (26) || Willingham (7) || Bird (8) || KeyArena  9,686 || 6–4
|- align="center" bgcolor="bbffbb"
| 11 || July 12 || 3:00pm || Washington || NBATV || 79–71 || Bird (22) || CashSmithWright (6) || Wright (7) || KeyArena  13,384 || 7–4 
|- align="center" bgcolor="ffbbbb"
| 12 || July 14 || 9:00pm || @ San Antonio || ESPN2 || 66–69 || Wright (18) || RobinsonWillingham (7) || Bird (7) || AT&T Center  9,167 || 7–5 
|- align="center" bgcolor="ffbbbb"
| 13 || July 16 || 8:00pm || @ Minnesota ||  || 62–69 || Wright (18) || Cash (9) || Smith (4) || Target Center  7,733 || 7–6 
|- align="center" bgcolor="ffbbbb"
| 14 || July 19 || 7:00pm || @ Chicago || ESPN2 || 69–78 || Bird (26) || Robinson (10) || BirdSmithWright (4) || Allstate Arena  6,026 || 7–7 
|- align="center" bgcolor="bbffbb"
| 15 || July 21 || 10:00pm || San Antonio || NBATVFS-SW || 73–55 || Wright (17) || CashRobinson (9) || Bird (7) || KeyArena  6,922 || 8–7 
|-
| colspan="11" align="center" valign="middle" | All-Star break
|- align="center" bgcolor="bbffbb"
| 16 || July 26 || 10:00pm || @ Phoenix || NBATV || 83–77 || Bird (18) || Cash (8) || Bird (7) || US Airways Center  6,108 || 9–7 
|- align="center" bgcolor="ffbbbb"
| 17 || July 29 || 8:00pm || @ Minnesota ||  || 67–92 || Cash (18) || Kobryn (9) || CashWright (4) || Target Center  7,856 || 9–8 
|- align="center" bgcolor="bbffbb"
| 18 || July 30 || 8:00pm || @ Tulsa ||  || 89–72 || Bird (29) || Cash (9) || Bird (7) || BOK Center  5,067 || 10–8 
|-

|- align="center" bgcolor="bbffbb"
| 19 || August 2 || 10:00pm || San Antonio ||  || 78–64 || Bird (17) || Cash (9) || Wright (7) || KeyArena  6,179 || 11–8 
|- align="center" bgcolor="bbffbb"
| 20 || August 5 || 10:00pm || Connecticut || NBATV || 81–79 || Bird (20) || Cash (7) || CashWright (5) || KeyArena  7,289 || 12–8
|- align="center" bgcolor="ffbbbb"
| 21 || August 7 || 3:00pm || @ Atlanta || NBATVSSO || 53–70 || Cash (16) || Smith (6) || Bird (3) || Philips Arena  7,337 || 12–9
|- align="center" bgcolor="ffbbbb"
| 22 || August 9 || 8:00pm || @ New York || ESPN2 || 56–58 || Bird (17) || CashWillingham (7) || BirdWright (4) || Prudential Center  6,732 || 12–10
|- align="center" bgcolor="bbffbb"
| 23 || August 11 || 10:00pm || Tulsa ||  || 77–63 || Little (19) || Little (7) || BirdLittleWright (3) || KeyArena  6,503 || 13–10
|- align="center" bgcolor="ffbbbb"
| 24 || August 13 || 10:00pm || Atlanta || NBATVKONG || 62–93 || Smith (15) || Robinson (6) || Bird (3) || KeyArena  9,686 || 13–11
|- align="center" bgcolor="ffbbbb"
| 25 || August 16 || 10:00pm || @ Phoenix ||  || 79–81 || Bird (23) || Cash (15) || Bird (8) || US Airways Center  8,870 || 13–12
|- align="center" bgcolor="bbffbb"
| 26 || August 20 || 10:00pm || New York ||  || 63–62 || Jackson (20) || CashJackson (7) || BirdSmith (4) || KeyArena  7,139 || 14–12
|- align="center" bgcolor="bbffbb"
| 27 || August 23 || 10:00pm || San Antonio ||  || 63–55 || Wright (16) || Cash (9) || Bird (5) || KeyArena  6,559 || 15–12
|- align="center" bgcolor="bbffbb"
| 28 || August 25 || 10:00pm || Tulsa ||  || 74–57 || Jackson (14) || Robinson (9) || Bird (4) || KeyArena  6,887 || 16–12
|- align="center" bgcolor="bbffbb"
| 29 || August 28 || 9:00pm || Los Angeles || ESPN2 || 65–63 || BirdJackson (14) || BirdCash (7) || Bird (4) || KeyArena  9,686 || 17–12
|- align="center" bgcolor="ffbbbb"
| 30 || August 30 || 10:30pm || @ Los Angeles || PRIME || 62–68 || Bird (15) || CashWright (8) || BirdWright (4) || Staples Center  9,023 || 17–13
|-

|- align="center" bgcolor="bbffbb"
| 31 || September 2 || 8:00pm || @ Tulsa ||  || 78–72 || Bird (21) || Willingham (7) || BirdWright (5) || BOK Center  6,117 || 18–13
|- align="center" bgcolor="bbffbb"
| 32 || September 3 || 8:00pm || @ San Antonio || NBATV || 70–60 || Bird (15) || Cash (12) || Bird (6) || AT&T Center  9,575 || 19–13
|- align="center" bgcolor="bbffbb"
| 33 || September 9 || 10:00pm || Phoenix || KONG || 85–70 || Smith (26) || Cash (14) || Bird (6) || KeyArena  9,686 || 20–13
|- align="center" bgcolor="bbffbb"
| 34 || September 11 || 9:00pm || Chicago || NBATVKONG || 81–70 || LittleSmith (17) || CashLittle (5) || BirdLittle (5) || KeyArena  13,659 || 21–13
|-

| All games are viewable on WNBA LiveAccess or ESPN3.com

Postseason

|- align="center" bgcolor="bbffbb"
| 1 || September 15 || 10:00pm || Phoenix || ESPN2 || 80–61 || Wright (21) || CashLittle (11) || Little (4) || KeyArena  7,279 || 1–0
|- align="center" bgcolor="ffbbbb"
| 2 || September 17 || 10:00pm || @ Phoenix || NBATV || 83-92 || Wright (18) || Cash (5) || Bird (4) || US Airways Center  9,356 || 1–1
|- align="center" bgcolor="ffbbbb"
| 3 || September 19 || 10:00pm || Phoenix || ESPN2 || 75-77 || Bird (22) || Cash (10) || SmithWright (4) || KeyArena  8,589 || 1–2
|-

Statistics

Regular season

Postseason

Awards and honors
Swin Cash was named WNBA Western Conference Player of the Week for the week of June 27, 2011.
Sue Bird was named WNBA Western Conference Player of the Week for the week of July 4, 2011.
Katie Smith was named WNBA Western Conference Player of the Week for the week of September 5, 2011.
Sue Bird was named to the 2011 WNBA All-Star Team as a starter.
Swin Cash was named to the 2011 WNBA All-Star Team as a starter.
Swin Cash was named the All-Star Game Most Valuable Player.
Tanisha Wright was named to the All-Defensive First Team.
Swin Cash was named to the All-Defensive Second Team.
Sue Bird was named to the All-WNBA Second Team.

References

Seattle Storm seasons
Seattle
2011 in sports in Washington (state)
Seattle Storm